A number of steamships have been named Arnhem, including:

, a cargo ship in service 1946–47
, a Hansa A Type cargo ship in service 1945–46
, a cargo liner in service 1946–68

Ship names